The Aixro XF-40 (or XF40) is a German aircraft engine, designed and produced by Aixro of Aachen for use in ultralight aircraft.

Design and development
The XF-40 is a single-rotor Wankel engine. It is a  displacement, liquid-cooled, gasoline engine design, with a poly V belt reduction drive with a reduction ratio of 1.25:1. It employs capacitor discharge ignition and produces  at 6500 rpm.

Applications
Roland Z-120 Relax
Garland Vampire

Specifications (XF-40)

See also

References

External links

Aixro aircraft engines
Aircraft Wankel engines